Adéọlá is both a Yoruba surname and a given name meaning "the crown or royalty of prestige and wealth". Notable people with the name include:

Fola Adeola (born 1954), Nigerian civil servant
Ogechi Adeola, Nigerian business academic
Olatunji Adeola (born 1983), Nigerian footballer
Adeola Fayehun (born 1984), Nigerian journalist
Adeola Odutola (1902–1995), Nigerian businessman
Adeola Lanre Runsewe (born 1989), Nigerian footballer
Adeola Dewis, Creative artist

Yoruba given names
Yoruba-language surnames